Andrew James Lawrence (born January 12, 1988) is an American actor, singer and filmmaker. He is known for his roles as Andy Roman in Brotherly Love (starring with his real life brothers Joey and Matthew) and T.J. Detweiler in Recess. Outside of his acting and music career, Lawrence made his directorial debut with the 2020 film The Office Mix-Up.

Early life
Lawrence was born in Abington, Pennsylvania, to Donna Lynn (née Shaw), a personal talent manager, and Joseph Lawrence Mignogna Sr., an insurance broker. He is of Italian, English, and Scottish descent. His family's surname was changed to "Lawrence" from "Mignogna" before he was born. Lawrence is the younger brother of actors Joey Lawrence and Matthew Lawrence.

Career
He started in show business at age three and made his professional acting debut in the television series Blossom, as Little Joey. In 1998, he became the voice of T.J. Detweiler in Disney's animated television series, Recess replacing Ross Malinger after voicing the character for two seasons. He would reprise the role again in the feature film and in several direct-to-video films, including Recess Christmas: Miracle on Third Street and Recess: All Growed Down. He has also done voice overs for video game characters, such as Pac in Battlefield 4 and Nick Ramos in Dead Rising 3. In November 2016, Lawrence released his debut EP, Kings March. That same year, Lawrence started a band with his brothers, Joey and Matt, named Still 3. The trio released its debut single, "Lose Myself," in February 2017.

Filmography

Film

Television

Video games

Production staff

Discography

EPs
 Kings of March (2016)

References

External links

1988 births
American male child actors
American male film actors
American male television actors
American male video game actors
American male voice actors
American people of Italian descent
American people of British descent
Living people
Male actors from Philadelphia
20th-century American male actors
21st-century American male actors